is a Japanese actress.

Filmography

Films
Gate of Flesh (1964), Roku
Daimon Otokode Shinitai (1969)
The Ramen Girl (2009), Megumi

Television
Oshin (1983), Mrs. Sakuragi
Kinpachi-sensei (1979), Miyo Tanaka

External links
 
 

1935 births
Actresses from Osaka
Living people